Getting Out of Nowhere is the third album released by the Norwegian band Euroboys. It features two covers, one of the song Master Charge, originally written by James Williamson and Iggy Pop for the album Kill City and the other is the English traditional Scarborough Fair.

Track listing 
All of My Money
Roadblock
Dirty Hole
Nice for a Change
Turn That Sound Up
Master Charge
Smash It to Pieces!
Needle Park
Stockholm
Scarborough Fair
Come On In, Your Time Is Up

References 

2000 albums